Lead Mountain is a summit in Custer County, Colorado, in the United States. It is in the Wet Mountain Range.

References

Mountains of Custer County, Colorado
Mountains of Colorado